The presence of Algerians in Spain dates back to the 1990s.

Numbers
As of 2019, in Spain, there are 66,778 regular immigrants from Algeria. The three cities with most number of Algerians are: Alicante, Barcelona and Zaragoza.

Algerians in Spain

 Adlène Guedioura
 Alejandro Agag (born 1970), businessperson
 Yuri Berchiche (born 1990), footballer

See also
 Algeria–Spain relations
 Arabs in Spain
 Black people in Spain

References       

African diaspora in Spain
Ethnic groups in Spain
Muslim communities in Europe